Artifex may refer to:

, a repair ship of the Royal Navy
Artifex Gallery, an art gallery in Taos, New Mexico
Artifex Pereo, an American rock band from Louisville, Kentucky
Artifex Software, an American company developing Ghostscript software suite
Cecidoses artifex, a moth of the family Cecidosidae
Exoletuncus artifex, a species of moth of the family Tortricidae
Pisidium artifex, a species of freshwater clam in the family Sphaeriidae
 Artifex (spider), a South Pacific genus of spiders